Mohammad Saikat Ali (born 23 October 1991 in Manikganj, Dhaka Division), known as Saikat Ali, is a Bangladeshi first-class, List A and Twenty20 cricketer since the 2008–09 Bangladeshi cricket season. Saikat is a right-handed batsman and a right arm medium pace bowler. He is currently (July 2016) playing for Dhaka Metropolis. Early in his career, he was playing for the Bangladesh national under-19 cricket team.

Saikat Ali, a right-hand batsman who bowls medium-pace, was in the Bangladesh squads for the 2008 and 2010 Under-19 World Cups. He scored a fifty as an opener in a one-dayer against England U-19 in November 2009 and also took 3-11 against the same team in another one-dayer. Saikat's favourite cricketer is Jacques Kallis whom he admires for his all-round skills.

Career Statistics

Career Averages

Vs Team

In Host Country

In Continent

Home Vs Away

By Year

By Season

Captains Involved

Is Captain / Is Not Captain

Is Keeper / Is Not Keeper

Toss

Toss And Batting Sequence

Batting First Vs Fielding First

In Team Innings

In Match Innings

Match Result

Result And Batting Sequence

In Tournament Type

In Match Number Per Series

In Batting Position

References

1991 births
Bangladeshi cricketers
Dhaka Division cricketers
Dhaka Metropolis cricketers
Sylhet Division cricketers
Bangladesh Central Zone cricketers
Bangladesh South Zone cricketers
Dhaka Dominators cricketers
Rangpur Riders cricketers
Mohammedan Sporting Club cricketers
Prime Bank Cricket Club cricketers
Living people